Players and pairs who neither have high enough rankings nor receive wild cards may participate in a qualifying tournament held one week before the annual Wimbledon Tennis Championships.

Seeds

  Tracey Morton-Rodgers /  Vickie Paynter (first round)
  Karine Quentrec /  Sandrine Testud (qualified)
  Maria Lindström /  Maria Strandlund (qualified)
  Elly Hakami /  Ann Henricksson (first round)

Qualifiers

  Maria Lindström /  Maria Strandlund
  Karine Quentrec /  Sandrine Testud

Lucky losers

  Gaby Coorengel /  Alison Smith
  Nicole Pratt /  Julie Steven

Qualifying draw

First qualifier

Second qualifier

External links

1994 Wimbledon Championships – Women's draws and results at the International Tennis Federation

Women's Doubles Qualifying
Wimbledon Championship by year – Women's doubles qualifying
Wimbledon Championships